Rebekka Findlay (born 11 January 1994)  is a Scottish female badminton player. She competed at the 2014 Commonwealth Games in Glasgow, Scotland.

Achievements

BWF International Challenge/Series
Women's Doubles

 BWF International Challenge tournament
 BWF International Series tournament
 BWF Future Series tournament

References

External links

 

1994 births
Living people
Sportspeople from Paisley, Renfrewshire
Scottish female badminton players
Commonwealth Games competitors for Scotland
Badminton players at the 2014 Commonwealth Games
Alumni of the University of the West of Scotland